Jonna Lisa Liljendahl (born 6 November 1970 in Stockholm) is a Swedish former child actress, well known for her role as Madicken (by Astrid Lindgren).

References

External links

Jonna Liljendahl on Swedish Film Database

Swedish child actresses
Actresses from Stockholm
1970 births
Living people
20th-century Swedish actresses